Foxfire is a village in Moore County, North Carolina, United States. The population was 902 at the 2010 census.

Geography
Foxfire is located at  (35.175635, -79.572843).

Foxfire is one of the few incorporated areas of North Carolina that does not host any primary numbered state highways (0-999).

Demographics

2020 census

As of the 2020 United States census, there were 1,288 people, 646 households, and 402 families residing in the village.

2000 census
As of the census of 2000, there were 474 people, 222 households, and 172 families residing in the village. The population density was 165.4 people per square mile (63.8/km2). There were 324 housing units at an average density of 113.1 per square mile (43.6/km2). The racial makeup of the village was 98.31% White, 1.27% African American and 0.42% Asian. Hispanic or Latino of any race were 1.05% of the population.

There were 222 households, out of which 12.2% had children under the age of 18 living with them, 73.9% were married couples living together, 2.3% had a female householder with no husband present, and 22.1% were non-families. 19.8% of all households were made up of individuals, and 11.7% had someone living alone who was 65 years of age or older. The average household size was 2.14 and the average family size was 2.40.

In the village, the population was spread out, with 11.0% under the age of 18, 3.0% from 18 to 24, 15.4% from 25 to 44, 22.8% from 45 to 64, and 47.9% who were 65 years of age or older. The median age was 64 years. For every 100 females, there were 100.0 males. For every 100 females age 18 and over, there were 98.1 males.

The median income for a household in the village was $54,750, and the median income for a family was $60,625. Males had a median income of $51,042 versus $24,643 for females. The per capita income for the village was $29,030. About 1.7% of families and 1.6% of the population were below the poverty line, including none of those under the age of eighteen or sixty-five or over.

References

External links
 Official Foxfire, NC website
 Moore County Chamber of Commerce

Villages in North Carolina
Villages in Moore County, North Carolina